Below is the list of Copa do Brasil de Futebol Feminino winners. The Copa do Brasil de Futebol Feminino was an annual women's football competition for clubs in Brazil established in 2007. The competition is open to all the top teams of Brazil's various state leagues. Thirty-two teams qualified and competed in a two-legged single elimination tournament that culminated in the finals. The finals were contested over two legs at each of the opponents' home field.

Four teams have won the competition. Santos is the most successful team in the history of the competition, having won it two times. Teams from São Paulo state have won the tournament three times, more than any other state.

Key

List of winners

(1)The winner of 2007 was Mato Grosso do Sul from Campo Grande (MS), which consisted of a team supplied by Saad from São Paulo.

Performances

By club

By state

References

External links
 Official website

Winners Feminino